Steven Kay Butler (born May 16, 1977) is an American mathematician specializing in graph theory and combinatorics. He is a Morrill Professor and the Barbara J. Janson Professor in Mathematics at Iowa State University.

Education and career
Butler earned his master's degree at Brigham Young University in 2003. His master's thesis was titled Bounding the Number of Graphs Containing Very Long Induced Paths. He completed a doctorate at the University of California, San Diego in 2008, authoring the dissertation Eigenvalues and Structures of Graphs, advised by Fan Chung.  Upon completing his postdoctoral studies at the University of California, Los Angeles, Butler joined the Iowa State University faculty in 2011, and was named the Barbara J. Janson Professor in Mathematics in 2017.  In 2015, Butler became the 512th (and so far final) person to have an Erdős number of 1, when he published a paper with Paul Erdős and Ronald Graham on Egyptian fractions.

References

External links

Official website

1977 births
Living people
Graph theorists
21st-century American mathematicians
Brigham Young University alumni
University of California, San Diego alumni